George W. Bush during his presidency of 8 years from 2001 to 2009 signed 56 legislations. Major ones of these included USA PATRIOT Act, Joint Resolution to Authorize the Use of United States Armed Forces Against Iraq, Job Creation and Worker Assistance Act of 2002, United States-Chile Free Trade Agreement Implementation Act, Controlling the Assault of Non-Solicited Pornography and Marketing Act, Foreign Investment and National Security Act of 2007. He vetoed the Food, Conservation, and Energy Act of 2008, Stem Cell Research Enhancement Act and 2 other legislations.

During his presidency America withdrew from the Anti-Ballistic Missile Treaty and the Kyoto Protocol. Some of the international treaties signed during Bush's presidency were SORT, Stockholm Convention on Persistent Organic Pollutants, International Cooperation on Computer Crimes among others.

Legislation signed

2001
June 7: Economic Growth and Tax Relief Reconciliation Act of 2001
September 28: United States-Jordan Free Trade Area Implementation Act
October 26: USA PATRIOT Act
November 28: Internet Tax Nondiscrimination Act

2002
January 8: No Child Left Behind Act
March 9: Job Creation and Worker Assistance Act of 2002
March 27: Bipartisan Campaign Reform Act of 2002
May 13: Farm Security and Rural Investment Act of 2002
July 30: Sarbanes-Oxley Act of 2002
October 16: Joint Resolution to Authorize the Use of United States Armed Forces Against Iraq
November 25: Homeland Security Act of 2002

2003
March 11: Do-Not-Call Implementation Act
April 30: PROTECT Act of 2003 (Prosecutorial Remedies and Other Tools to end the Exploitation of Children Today Act)
May 27: United States Leadership Against HIV/AIDS, Tuberculosis and Malaria Act of 2003.
May 28: Jobs and Growth Tax Relief Reconciliation Act of 2003
September 3: United States-Chile Free Trade Agreement Implementation Act
September 3: United States-Singapore Free Trade Agreement Implementation Act
September 4: Prison Rape Elimination Act of 2003
November 5: Partial-Birth Abortion Ban Act of 2003
December 3: Healthy Forests Restoration Act of 2003
December 8: Medicare Prescription Drug, Improvement, and Modernization Act of 2003
December 16: American Dream Down Payment Act of 2003
December 16: Controlling the Assault of Non-Solicited Pornography and Marketing Act (CAN-SPAM)

2004
April 1: Unborn Victims of Violence Act (Laci and Conner’s Law)
July 17: United States-Morocco Free Trade Agreement Implementation Act
August 3: United States-Australia Free Trade Agreement Implementation Act
October 22: American Jobs Creation Act of 2004

2005
February 18: Class Action Fairness Act of 2005
May 11: Real ID Act
April 20: Bankruptcy Reform Act of 2005
August 2: Dominican Republic-Central America-United States Free Trade Agreement Implementation Act
August 8: Energy Policy Act of 2005
August 10: Safe, Accountable, Flexible, and Efficient Transportation Equity Act of 2005 (SAFETEA)
October 26: Protection of Lawful Commerce in Arms Act

2006
 January 11: United States-Bahrain Free Trade Agreement Implementation Act
 March 9: USA PATRIOT Improvement and Reauthorization Act
 July 27: Adam Walsh Child Protection and Safety Act
 August 17: The Pension Protection Act of 2006
 September 30: Iran Freedom and Support Act
 October 4: Department of Homeland Security Appropriations Act, 2007
 October 17: Military Commissions Act of 2006
 October 26: Secure Fence Act of 2006

2007
 May 22: Food, Conservation, and Energy Act of 2008
 May 25: U.S. Troop Readiness, Veterans' Care, Katrina Recovery, and Iraq Accountability Appropriations Act, 2007
 July 26: Foreign Investment and National Security Act of 2007
 August 9: America COMPETES Act
 December 19: Energy Independence and Security Act of 2007

2008
 January 8: National Instant Criminal Background Check System Improvement Amendments Law
 February 13: Economic Stimulus Act of 2008
 May 21: Genetic Information Nondiscrimination Act 
 June 30: Supplemental Appropriations Act of 2008
 June 30: Post-9/11 Veterans Educational Assistance Act of 2008
 July 30: Housing and Economic Recovery Act of 2008
 August 14: Consumer Product Safety Improvement Act
 October 3: Emergency Economic Stabilization Act of 2008
 October 13: Drug Trafficking Vessel Interdiction Act
 October 16: Rail Safety Improvement Act of 2008

Legislation vetoed
President Bush vetoed five pieces of legislation during his presidency:
July 19, 2006: Stem Cell Research Enhancement Act
May 1, 2007: H.R. 1591 , U.S. Troop Readiness, Veterans' Care, Katrina Recovery, and Iraq Accountability Appropriations Act of 2007
May 21, 2007: Food, Conservation, and Energy Act of 2008 (veto overridden by Congress)
June 20, 2007: Stem Cell Research Enhancement Act of 2007
October 3, 2007: State Children's Health Insurance Program Reauthorization Act of 2007

International treaties signed
George W. Bush signed several international treaties, including :
SORT (2002) - better known as the Moscow Treaty, the United States and Russia agreed to limit their nuclear arsenal to 1700–2200 operationally deployed warheads each.
Stockholm Convention on Persistent Organic Pollutants (2001)
International Cooperation on Computer Crimes (2001) 
Involvement of Children in Armed Conflict (2000) 
Sale of Children, Child Prostitution and Pornography (2000)

Withdrawal from international treaties
Early on in his first term, George W. Bush withdrew from a number of international treaties, most of which had previously been signed but not ratified, including:
Anti-Ballistic Missile Treaty
Kyoto Protocol

References

2000s politics-related lists
Legislative programmes
Presidency of George W. Bush
George W. Bush-related lists